Laura Anne Gilman (born 1967, New Jersey) is an American fantasy author.

Biography
Laura Anne Gilman was born in 1967 in suburban New Jersey. She received a Liberal Arts education from the Skidmore College in Saratoga Springs, New York, and was inducted into the Phi Alpha Theta honors society.  She started her career in publishing as an editorial assistant in New York City. Laura Anne Gilman is a member of the BookView Cafe, Science Fiction and Fantasy Writers of America, and Novelists, Inc.

After publishing several short stories (her first professional fiction sale was 1994 to Amazing Stories), some media tie-ins, and a job as an executive editor she published her first original novel Staying Dead, a "Cosa Nostradamus"-universe "Retrievers" book. The first book of a second series in this universe named "Paranormal Scene Investigations", Hard Magic, was published in Spring 2010, and a second should follow in Spring 2011. Flesh and Fire, the first novel in the "Vineart War" series, was released in 2009. The "Vineart War" series deviates from the urban fantasy setting of the Cosa Nostradamus books, having more of a traditional fantasy feel. Flesh and Fire was nominated for the 2009 Nebula Award for Best Novel.

Gilman currently lives outside Seattle, Washington.  She owns and runs d.y.m.k. productions, her editorial services company.  She formerly managed the tasting room for Rocky Pond Winery in Chelan, Washington.

Works

Cosa Nostradamus
The world of the Cosa Nostradamus is a world where magic is alive and well in a modern age. Cosa Nostradamus is the name given to the entire magical community – Human Talent and non-human ‘fatae.’

Retrievers 
Staying Dead, Luna (July 2004) 
 1.5 "Palimpsest" in Powers of Detection (Anthology), Dana Stabenow (ed.), Ace Books (Oct. 2004)  
 2. Curse the Dark, Luna (July 2005) 
 3. Bring It on, Luna (July 2006), 
 3.5 "Overrush" in Murder by Magic: Twenty Tales of Crime and the Supernatural, Rosemary Edghill (ed.), Warner Books (Oct. 2004) 
 4. Burning Bridges, Luna (June 2007), 
 5. Free Fall, Luna (May 2008), 
 6. Blood from Stone, Luna (April 2009),

Paranormal Scene Investigations 
Hard Magic, Luna (2010), 
Pack of Lies, Luna (2011)
Tricks of the Trade, Luna (2012)
Dragon Justice, Luna (2012)

Anthologies 
 Stories of the Cosa Nostradamus, e-book, Book view Café (April 2010)

Grail Quest
The Camelot Spell, HarperCollins (March 2006), 
Morgain's Revenge, HarperCollins (July 2006), 
The Shadow Companion, HarperCollins (November 2006),

The Vineart War
"Wine. A world with a source of magic that is grapes, in the vintages made with each different strain of grapes. Wait, before you wander off, think about that a minute. Think of how much goes into a bottle of wine, from how the grapes are grown to how each harvest is gathered and pressed and bottled. Then add in a touch of magic along with the flavor, binding an intent with each batch. It made for a phenomenal structure to build on. Each geographical area in the Lands Vin has its own particular vintage, its own magical specialty.

The Vinearts, those responsible for crafting each vintage, are a solitary caste, tending their vines and wines and rarely communicating with each other. The creation myth of the vines themselves is based on this structure of each tending to their own specialty. But as the book progresses, it becomes apparent to one Master that this solitude cannot continue as it is. Something is going very wrong in the vineyards, from pests to plagues out of season, and it drives that Master Vineart to break that solitude and try to gather information before the vines are lost.

The threat is very real, and the sense of urgency pulls the reader from page to page. The reader starts following the development of a new apprentice Vineart, where we gain a sense of the Vinearts love for their vines, and the magic that they infuse into their wines. And from there the world widens, as the reader learns of the problems emerging throughout the Lands Vin."

Flesh and Fire, Pocket Books (October 2009),  (Nebula Nominee)
Weight of Stone, Gallery Books (October 2010), 
The Shattered Vine, Gallery Books (October 2011),

Devil's West
Silver on the Road, Saga Press (October 6, 2015), 
The Cold Eye, Saga Press (January 10, 2017),  (Endeavour Award winner)
Red Waters Rising, Saga Press (June 26, 2018),

Media tie-in novels

Quantum Leap
 Double or Nothing (with C. J. Henderson), Boxtree Ltd (July 1995),

Buffy the Vampire Slayer
 Visitors, (with Josepha Sherman), Pocket Books (May 1999), 
 Deep Water, (with Josepha Sherman), Pocket Books (February 2000),

Poltergeist: The Legacy
 The Shadows Between as L.A. Liverakos, Ace Books (October 2000),

Anthologies edited
Treachery and Treason, with Jennifer Heddler (ed.), ROC Books (March 2000), 
Otherwere: Stories of Transformation, with Keith R. A. DeCandido (ed.), Ace Books (September 1996),

Nonfiction
Coping with Cerebral Palsy, Rosen Publishing Group (April 2001), 
Yeti, the Abominable Snowman, (Unsolved Mysteries), Rosen Publishing Group (December 2001), 
Economics: How Economics Works, Lerner Publications (January 2006), 
Practical Meerkat's 52 Bits of Useful Info for Young (and Old) Writers (January 2012), 

NovellaDragon Virus, Fairwood Press (June 2011), 
“They say the end is nigh. I think we’re living in the aftermath already.” (Dragon Virus, pg. 69)

"It starts with the little uncomfortable things- visions of apocalypse, Raptures full of dragon wings. And then the dragons become all too real. It is an unexplained mutation, the Long gene, dragons come down to warp the basic recipe of humanity. Babies die, born with mutations that could not support life. No known cause. No treatment.

But then babies start to live, the mutations becoming viable, and the real problems start."

Short fiction
"Along Came a Spider"
"Apparent Horizon"
"Catseye"
"Clean Up Your Room!" in Don't Forget Your Spacesuit, Dear Jody Lynn Nye (ed.), Baen Books (July 1, 1996), 
"A Day in the Life," in The Day the Magic Stopped,  Baen Books (October 1995), 
"Dispossession" (Maynstream/ghost story) in Spooks, Tina Jens (ed.), Twilight Tales Press
"Don't You Want To Be Beautiful?"
"Dragons"
"Every Comfort of Home"
"Exposure" in Blood Muse: Timeless Tales of Vampires in the Arts, Esther M. Friesner & Martin H. Greenberg (ed.), Dutton Adult (December 1, 1995), 
"Harvey and Fifth"
"His Essential Nature" in The Best of Dreams of Decadence, Roc Books (2003), 
"In the Night"
"KidPro" in Wizards, Inc., DAW (6. November 2007), 
"Overrush" in Murder by Magic, Rosemary Edghill (ed.), Warner Books, 0-446-67962-3
"Palimpsest" in Powers of Detection, Dana Stabenow (ed.), Ace Books,0-441-01197-7
"Site Fourteen"
"Sleepwork"
"Source Material" (poem) in Tales from the Wonder Zone: Odyssey, Trifolium Books Inc,  (Prix Aurora Awards 2005 final ballot)
"Sympathetic Magic"
"Talent"
"The Road Taken"
"Turnings"
"Where Angels Fear to Tread" in Highwaymen, Rogues, and Robbers, DAW Books (June 1997), 
"Werelove" in Running with the Pack, Prime Books (May 2010), 

Pseudonymous works

L.A. Kornetsky
 Fixed, A Gin & Tonic Mystery, Gallery Books (November 2012), 
 Collared, A Gin & Tonic Mystery, Gallery Books (•October 2013), 
 Doghouse, A Gin & Tonic Mystery, Pocket Books (•July 2014), 
 Clawed, A Gin & Tonic Mystery, Pocket Books (•May 2015), 

Anna LeonardDreamcatcher, Nocturne e-book (August 2008)The Night Serpent, Nocturne (September 2008), The Hunted, Nocturne (April, 2010), Shifter's Destiny (2012)

L. A. Liverakos
 The Shadows Between'', a Poltergeist: The Legacy novel, Ace Books (October 2000),

References

External links

Laura Anne Gilman's official website
d. y. m. k. Productions Laura Anne Gilman's writing and editorial services website

1967 births
Living people
American fantasy writers
Novelists from New Jersey
20th-century American novelists
21st-century American novelists
20th-century American women writers
21st-century American women writers
American women short story writers
Women science fiction and fantasy writers
American women novelists
20th-century American short story writers
21st-century American short story writers